is a Japanese snack food and pharmaceutical company. It is currently a subsidiary of Meiji Holdings and a Japanese leader in the area of infectious disease with 18% market share. It markets treatments for depression, obsessive-compulsive disorder, vaccines and allergy drugs. Meiji Pharma is doing research in generic anticancer drugs and biosimilars with partner organisations. 

It is a confectionery and pharmaceutical company that manufactures a wide range of products including Hello Panda and Yan Yan. Its competitors include Ezaki Glico, Kabaya, Lotte Confectionery and Morinaga.

They acquired the Stauffer Biscuit Company based in York, Pennsylvania, USA in 2004.

On April 1, 2009, Meiji Seika Kaisha, Ltd. and Meiji Dairies Corporation established a joint holding company, Meiji Holdings, which is a constituent of the Nikkei 225 index. Two years later on the day, the food and healthcare business was taken over by Meiji Dairies to form "Meiji Co., Ltd.", and Meiji Seika was reorganized to a pharmaceutical company "Meiji Seika Pharma Co., Ltd." In 2014 Meiji acquired Medreich for $290 million, an Indian company active in selling generic pharmaceuticals to Europe, Asia and Africa.

Logos

References

External links

Meiji Seika Pharma Co., Ltd. (English)
Meiji Co., Ltd. (English)
Stauffer Biscuit Company

Japanese companies established in 1916
Japanese chocolate companies
Confectionery companies of Japan
Food and drink companies based in Tokyo
Japanese brands
Pharmaceutical companies based in Tokyo
Pharmaceutical companies established in 1916
Snack food manufacturers of Japan
2004 mergers and acquisitions
2011 mergers and acquisitions